Scott Liebler (December 22, 1959 - October 14, 1989) was a racing driver from Manhattan, Kansas. To date Liebler is one of two racing deaths during the SCCA National Championship Runoffs, along with Jim Ladd.

Racing career
After competing in autocross, Liebler raced in various SCCA single seater classes since 1979. Liebler was set to make his Runoffs debut in 1983. In a Citation-Zink Z18B he failed to qualify in the Formula Vee class. He returned in 1985 in the Formula Atlantic class in a Ralt RT4. Liebler qualified eleventh and finished the race in ninth place. Between 1986 and 1989 the Kansas based driver won the Midwest Division championship in the Formula Atlantic class four consecutive times. In 1987 Liebler had a heavy crash at the Lake Afton Grand Prix, near Wichita, Kansas. At the street circuit Liebler hit a pole splitting his car in two pieces. In the violent crash the driver suffered a broken pelvis, cracked teeth and double vision for almost six months.

His best result at the Runoffs came in 1988. At Road Atlanta Liebler finished in fourth place. The following year Liebler competed at his home track, Heartland Park Topeka, in the Atlantic Championship East championship race. Liebler finished thirteenth overall, third in the B Class for older cars.

Fatal accident
As he won the SCCA Midwest Division championship in the Formula Atlantic class, Liebler qualified to compete in the SCCA National Championship Runoffs. The fast driver ran a Martini Mk.53 with a Volkswagen engine. Liebler qualified in eighth place for the race on Saturday. In turn 11 corner, Liebler's front tire touched the rear tire of Jim Brouk's Ralt RT4. Liebler's car launched into the air and rolled several times before coming to rest a 100 yards after the crash.

The injured driver was transported to Northeast Georgia Medical Center in nearby Gainesville, Georgia. Liebler died Sunday night of Cerebral edema.

Complete motorsports results

SCCA National Championship Runoffs

References

1959 births
1989 deaths
People from Manhattan, Kansas
Racing drivers from Kansas
Atlantic Championship drivers
SCCA National Championship Runoffs participants
Racing drivers who died while racing
Sports deaths in Georgia (U.S. state)